Kodi Najm (born 29 July 1989) is an Iranian-American musician, composer and producer. He is best known for his film compositions and soundtrack work. Najm was the lead guitar player for the rock band Hypernova in the early 2000s.

Early life and musical career 
Kodi Najm was born in Tehran, Iran. He left Iran when he was 17 years old and moved to the New York City where he currently resides. He has written and released 4 Ep's (Universal, Fairy Tales (single), Exit Strategy)  and one full-length album Through the Chaos as a member of Hypernova. Najm has also recorded and composed a heavily electronic and orchestral concept album for the motion picture Koyakatsi in early 2013.

Solo work
Correspondant Compilation 07

- 'E.V.B.T (East Village Bass tool)' with Krystal Klear

Filmography
 Vortex (2019)
 Ziona (2017)
Thirty-Six Hours (short) (2016)
 Koyakatsi OST - Koyakatsi (Motion picture by Ayoub Qanir)
 Vex (short) (2014)
 Room 237 (short) (2012)

Band Discography
 Hypernova - Consequences (2006)
 Hypernova - Universal (2008)
 Hypernova - Fairy Tales (single) (2009)
 Hypernova -Through The Chaos (2010)
 Hypernova - Exit Strategy (2011)

References

1989 births
Living people